Vron Ware is a British academic and visiting professor at the Gender Institute of the London School of Economics and Political Science. She was previously a Professor at Kingston University editor of Searchlight magazine from 1981 to 1983, and worked as a freelance journalist until 1987 when she co-founded the Women's Design Service. She taught cultural geography at the University of Greenwich from 1992 to 1999, sociology and gender studies at Yale University from 1999 to 2005, and was senior research fellow at the Centre for Research on Socio-Cultural Change at the Open University from 2008 to 2014.

Career
Over the past 25 years Ware has been one of a small number of scholar-activists pioneering the study of race and culture in contemporary Britain, beginning with the publication of a pamphlet on women and the National Front in 1978. In 1987, Ware co-founded the Women’s Design Service with Sue Cavanagh and Wendy Davis. The organization believed that cities needed to be radically altered to suit women’s needs. The group put out a publication to create women’s bathroom facilities to better suit women’s needs like diaper changing areas and improved sanitary waste facilities.

She established an international reputation for research on anti-racism and feminism in 1992 when her first academic book, Beyond the Pale, was published. Her intervention in feminist theory and practice, in particular her focus on the discursive production of whiteness through a gendered reading of colonial history, was instrumental in shaping a new international field of study that has since become known as Critical Whiteness studies. Who Cares About Britishness? A global view of the national identity debate (2007) was commissioned by the British Council as a contribution to domestic debates about citizenship, belonging and national identity in the UK. The work explores the practice of intercultural dialogue by engaging with young people living in a variety of postcolonial contexts, from Dublin to Dhaka. She is married to the British academic Paul Gilroy.

In 2017, Ware's body of photographs documenting the Black People's Day of Action on 2 March 1981 were exhibited in the 13 Dead, Nothing Said exhibition at Goldsmiths, University of London.

Current research
Ware was a Research Fellow in the Centre for Socio-Cultural Change (CReSC), and the Centre for Citizenship, Identities and Governance (CCIG) at the Open University until 2014 when she became professor of sociology at Kingston University. In 2008, she began a new project looking at Britishness and militarization in the UK, using the recruitment and employment of Commonwealth soldiers as an entry point. Examining how the figure of the British soldier has acquired a prominence in mainstream culture not seen for many decades, her research focuses on questions of racism and citizenship, militarism and cultural diversity. The book Military Migrants (2012) argues that the degree to which the armed forces are seen to have become modernised is central to the management of modern warfare on the domestic front. Maintaining a multi-faith and culturally diverse army has been recognised as a valuable military tool in Afghanistan too.

She has a 2018–19 Leverhulme Research Fellowship.

Bibliography

Women and the National Front (1978)
At Women's Convenience (with Sue Cavanagh; 1990)
Beyond the Pale: White Women, Racism and History (1992)
Out of Whiteness: Color, Politics, and Culture (with Les Back; 2002)
Branquidade: Identidade Branca e Multiculturalismo (Whiteness: White Identity and Multiculturalism), Rio de Janeiro: Garamond (edited collection) (2004)
Who Cares About Britishness? (2007)
Military Migrants. Fighting for YOUR country (2012)
Return of A Native: Learning From The Land (2022)

References

External links
 Ware, V. (2009), "Towards a Sociology of Resentment: A Debate on Class and Whiteness", Sociological Research Online, 13(5)9.
 Blaagaard, Bolette B., "Workings of whiteness: interview with Vron Ware", Social Identities 17:1, 1 January 2011, pp. 153–61.
 Interview with Vron Ware and Paul Gilroy (1/2), "Whose history?: Conversation about heritage, the abolition of slavery and national sentiment", Melanine, 23 January 2008.
 Interview with Vron Ware and Paul Gilroy (2/2), "Transnationalism in translation: the engaged intellectual’s melancholia", Melanine, 12 February 2008.
 Vron Ware at openDemocracy.

 Vron Ware's Personal Web Site 
 Professor Ware's LSE Gender Institute page 

Academics of Kingston University
Academics of the Open University
Academics of the University of Greenwich
British geographers
British journalists
British sociologists
British women academics
British women sociologists
Living people
Yale University faculty
Year of birth missing (living people)